Felipe González de Canales is a Spanish author and educator who co-founded the Escuelas Familiares Agrarias (Agrarian Family Schools) in Spain for agriculture education.

Today there are 30 schools in Spain with 40,000 alumni, and 3,000 students. These schools have influenced the establishment of 14 agricultural schools in Peru, nine in Argentina, and six in the Philippines.

Gonzalez is also the President of the Federacion de Instituto del Desarollo Comunitario (Federation of the Institute of Community Development). He is also the Secretary-General of the Red Estatal de Desarollo Rural (Statewide Network for Rural Development) or Reder. He is also the founder of the farmers trade union Jóvenes Agricultores (Young Farmers) and of the Unión Sindical Obrera (Workers Trade Union), with José Luis Fernández Santillana.

Gonzalez co-wrote the book, Roturar y sembrar, published by Rialp on the fortieth anniversary of the agrarian schools.

Publications and conferences
Roturar y sembrar, a history of the EFAs, written by Felipe Gonzalez de Canales
El futuro del mundo rural en una sociedad comprometida y con proyecto - sponsored by the Universidad Internacional Menendez  Pelayo. 
El Punto de Vista de los Grupos de Desarrollo Rural

References
'Roturar y sembrar' hace historia de las Escuelas Familiares Agrarias -article in Ediciones Digitales Hoy. 
Catholic.net article
History of the Escuelas Familiares Agrarias
Una Siembra Fecunda - a story of the EFAs
Roturar y sembrar, a history of the EFAs, written by Felipe Gonzalez de Canales
Los desafíos del siglo XXI y sus repercusiones de futuro en el mundo rural - conference delivered by Felipe Gonzalez de Canales
Red Estatal de Desarollo Rural (Reder)
EFA: Formacion con raices profundas

Spanish trade union leaders
Agriculture in Spain
Opus Dei members